Lucy Katherine Liemann (born 24 November 1973) is an English actress. After graduation she was spotted at a supermarket by a voice scout who urged her to become a voice artist. Liemann then went on to study acting at the Academy of Live and Recorded Arts. She has worked in theatre, television and film.

Starting in stage productions, she starred in the initial London production of Carl Djerassi's play Phallacy in 2005.

After a series of roles in various standard British television shows, including The Bill and Agatha Christie's Poirot, she played the part of Lucy in the third part of the Jason Bourne film series, The Bourne Ultimatum.

Liemann played recurring character Sam Phillips in the television series Moving Wallpaper, and stars as Reggie Perrin's nubile colleague Jasmine Strauss in the BBC's 2009–10 reprises of the classic tales.

Filmography
2005 – Footballers' Wives: Extra Time, Penny Harcourt, Episode 1.3
2005 – The Bill, Ruth Coyne, TV Series, Episode: “373:Torn”
2005, 2008 – Agatha Christie's Poirot, Miss Burgess, “Cards on the Table” (2005), Sonia, “Third Girl” (2008)
2006 – The IT Crowd, Julie, TV Series, Episode: “The Haunting of Bill Crouse”
2006 – Are You Ready for Love, Rachel
2006 – Private Life, Ruth Ackroyd
2007 – Nuclear Secrets, Janet Chisholm
2007 – Wild at Heart, Gloria, TV Series, Episode 2.7
2007 – The Bourne Ultimatum, Lucy
2007 – Rob Newman's History of the World... Backwards, Episode #1.3, Duchess of Padua
2008 – MindFlesh, Tessa
2008 – Moving Wallpaper, Sam Phillips, TV Series, 18 episodes, 2008–2009)
2009 – Reggie Perrin, Jasmine, TV Series, 12 episodes
2009 – Hotel Babylon, Charlotte Newhouse Episode #4.7
2010–14 – Rev, Ellie Pattman, TV Series, 14 episodes
2011 – Lewis, Bethan Vickery, TV Series, Episode: “The Mind Has Mountains”
2011 – New Tricks, Anna King, TV Series, Episode: “Lost in Translation”
2013 – Midsomer Murders,  Beatrix Ordish, TV Series, Episode: "Schooled in Murder"
2014 – Moving On,  Samantha, Episode: "Madge" 
2014 – Agatha Raisin and the Quiche of Death, Sarah
2015 – Inspector George Gently, Rose Dixon, TV Series, Episode: “Gently with the Women”
2016 – HIM, Beth, 3 episodes
2016–present – Agatha Raisin, Sarah Bloxby, TV Series

References

External links

Liemann at Spotlight

Living people
British television actresses
1972 births
People from the London Borough of Barnet
Alumni of the Academy of Live and Recorded Arts
21st-century British actresses
British stage actresses
British film actresses
Actresses from London
21st-century English women
21st-century English people